Jason Paul Knight (born 13 February 2001) is an Irish footballer who plays as a midfielder for EFL League One club  Derby County and for the Republic of Ireland national team.

Club career

Early career
Knight began his career at Cabinteely, playing for the club from age 4. He was signed by Derby County at age 16.

Derby County
Knight made his first team debut on 5 August 2019 in a 2–1 win away at Huddersfield Town. On 22 January 2020 Knight signed a new contract with Derby running until June 2023 .

On 16 January 2021, Knight was handed his first captaincy for Derby County, in Wayne Rooney's first game as coach.

In the 2022/23 season, Knight was often deployed as a right wing back, showing his versatility as a player.

International career
Knight has represented his native Ireland at every level from under-15 right up to under-21 and made his debut for the senior team away to Finland on 14 October 2020. He made his full debut against Bulgaria in the UEFA Nations League 18 November 2020. Knight scored his first senior international goal on the 3 June 2021 in a 4–1 win over Andorra in a friendly at the Estadi Nacional.

Personal life
Jason was educated in Clonkeen College, Deansgrange, Co Dublin.

His brother Kevin Knight is also a footballer, a former Leicester City youth and Republic of Ireland under-19 international currently playing with League of Ireland First Division club Bray Wanderers, having previously played for Cabinteely, Shamrock Rovers B, Athlone Town and Longford Town.

Career statistics

Club

International

Scores and results list Republic of Ireland's goal tally first, score column indicates score after each Knight goal.

Honours
Individual
FAI Under-16 International Player of the Year for 2017.

References

External links
Jason Knight at DCFC
Player Focus, Jason Knight at YouTube

2001 births
Living people
Republic of Ireland association footballers
Republic of Ireland youth international footballers
Republic of Ireland under-21 international footballers
Republic of Ireland international footballers
Association football midfielders
English Football League players
Derby County F.C. players
Republic of Ireland expatriate association footballers
Irish expatriate sportspeople in England